Howell Township is a civil township of Livingston County in the U.S. state of Michigan. The population was 6,702 at the 2010 census, up from 5,679 at the 2000 census. The township is bordered on the southeast by the city of Howell, but the two are administered autonomously.

Communities
Fleming is an unincorporated community at Fleming and Warner roads and Grand River Avenue.

Geography
Howell Township is in central Livingston County, on the north and west sides of the city of Howell, the county seat. Interstate 96 passes through the southern part of the township, with access from Exit 133 (Highway M-59). I-96 leads west  to Lansing and southeast  to Detroit, while M-59 leads east  to Pontiac.

The eastern part of the township is within the Shiawassee River watershed, draining north to Saginaw Bay, while the western part drains to the Red Cedar River, flowing west to the Grand River and Lake Michigan.

Demographics
As of the census of 2000, there were 5,679 people, 1,902 households, and 1,565 families residing in the township. The racial makeup of the township was 97.75% White, 0.18% African American, 0.30% Native American, 0.25% Asian, 0.02% Pacific Islander, 0.30% from other races, and 1.22% from two or more races. Hispanic or Latino of any race were 1.07% of the population.

There were 1,902 households, out of which 40.4% had children under the age of 18 living with them, 72.7% were married couples living together, 6.5% had a female householder with no husband present, and 17.7% were non-families. 13.7% of all households were made up of individuals, and 5.2% had someone living alone who was 65 years of age or older.  The average household size was 2.91 and the average family size was 3.20.

In the township the population was spread out, with 28.0% under the age of 18, 6.2% from 18 to 24, 31.3% from 25 to 44, 24.2% from 45 to 64, and 10.2% who were 65 years of age or older.  The median age was 37 years. For every 100 females, there were 102.3 males.  For every 100 females age 18 and over, there were 96.7 males.

The median income for a household in the township was $63,114, and the median income for a family was $67,034. Males had a median income of $50,744 versus $28,958 for females. The per capita income for the township was $23,840.  About 1.4% of families and 2.8% of the population were below the poverty line, including 1.3% of those under age 18 and 3.7% of those age 65 or over.

References

External links

 Howell Township official website

Townships in Livingston County, Michigan
Townships in Michigan